Troy Trepanier is an American automobile designer and builder. He is the owner of Rad Rides by Troy in Manteno, Illinois. Among many other awards and accolades, he built the 2007 Ridler Award-winning 1936 Ford three-window coupe, First Love, for Ross Myers.

References

American automobile designers
Living people
Year of birth missing (living people)